Xiang Jing is a book about a Chinese board game. Xiang Jing was written in 569 CE by Emperor Wu of Northern Zhou, who was a great fan of race games.

Race games
569
6th century in China